Sten Gustaf Ingemar Erickson (born 18 December 1929) is a retired Swedish triple jumper. He competed at the 1958 European Athletics Championships and 1960 Summer Olympics and finished in 13th and 11th place, respectively. Erickson won the national title in 1959 and 1960, and held the national record from 1959 to 1969.

References

1929 births
Living people
Swedish male triple jumpers
Olympic athletes of Sweden
Athletes (track and field) at the 1960 Summer Olympics